Dale Brede (born 12 October 1974 in Canberra) is a racing driver from Australia. He formerly competed in the V8 Supercars championship.

Career results

Complete Bathurst 1000 results

† Porter was the entered driver but was killed in a support race. Caruso would replace him.

References

External links
Profile at Driver Database

1974 births
Living people
Australian racing drivers
Sportspeople from Canberra
21st-century Australian people